Matthew or Matt Baker may refer to:

Entertainment
 Matt Baker (artist) (1921–1959), American comic book artist
 Matt Baker (born 1977), British television presenter
 Matthew Baker (bass-baritone), Australian bass-baritone opera singer
 Sergeant Matt Baker, fictional video game character

Sports
 Matt Baker (horse trainer) (1955–2017), American racehorse trainer
 Matt Baker (footballer, born 1979), English former footballer
 Matt Baker (footballer, born 2003), Welsh footballer
 Matt Baker (American football) (born 1983), American football player
 Matthew Baker (soccer) (born 1988), American soccer player
 Mashu Baker or Matthew Baker (born 1994), Japanese judoka

Other
 Matthew Baker (governor) (died 1513), governor of Jersey (1486–1494)
 Matt E. Baker (born 1957), Pennsylvania politician
 Mathew Baker (1530–1613), Tudor shipwright

See also
 Baker (surname)